White Cloud (Ioway: Chína Maxúthga pronounced  or Chína Maxúhga pronounced , meaning "Village Cloud-White") is a city in Doniphan County, Kansas, United States.  As of the 2020 census, the population of the city was 115.  It was named for Francis White Cloud, a son of Chief White Cloud of the Iowa people.  White Cloud is the seat of government for the Iowa Tribe of Kansas and Nebraska.

History
The first post office at White Cloud was established in July, 1855.

In 1857, the town site was purchased by John Utt and Enoch Spaulding, two land promoters from Oregon, Missouri, who then sold lots in the town.  White Cloud prospered by taking advantage of steamboat traffic on the nearby Missouri River.

In 1913, ten-year-old Wilbur Chapman of White Cloud gained widespread publicity after raising and selling a pig for $25, which he donated to the American Mission to Lepers.  An obelisk-shaped monument was installed in front of the Community Christian Church in White Cloud in Chapman's honor.

Some scenes from the 1973 movie Paper Moon were filmed in White Cloud.  White Cloud is featured in episode 4 of the 2008 television documentary Stephen Fry in America.

The entire downtown district of White Cloud is listed on the National Register of Historic Places, as are the Poulet House and the White Cloud School.

Geography
White Cloud is located at  (39.977348, -95.299888).

Demographics

White Cloud is part of the St. Joseph, MO–KS Metropolitan Statistical Area.

2010 census
As of the census of 2010, there were 176 people, 86 households, and 44 families residing in the city. The racial makeup of the city was 68.2% White, 3.4% African American, 18.8% Native American, 1.1% from other races, and 8.5% from two or more races. Hispanic or Latino of any race were 5.1% of the population.

There were 86 households, of which 24.4% had children under the age of 18 living with them, 33.7% were married couples living together, 12.8% had a female householder with no husband present, 4.7% had a male householder with no wife present, and 48.8% were non-families. 40.7% of all households were made up of individuals, and 24.5% had someone living alone who was 65 years of age or older. The average household size was 2.05 and the average family size was 2.75.

The median age in the city was 44.7 years. 19.9% of residents were under the age of 18; 12.6% were between the ages of 18 and 24; 18.8% were from 25 to 44; 27.3% were from 45 to 64; and 21.6% were 65 years of age or older. The gender makeup of the city was 51.1% male and 48.9% female.

2000 census
As of the census of 2000, there were 239 people, 108 households, and 57 families residing in the city. The racial makeup of the city was 70.71% White, 3.77% African American, 17.99% Native American, 1.26% Asian, 1.26% from other races, and 5.02% from two or more races. Hispanic or Latino of any race were 5.44% of the population.

There were 108 households, out of which 26.9% had children under the age of 18 living with them, 37.0% were married couples living together, 11.1% had a female householder with no husband present, and 46.3% were non-families. 36.1% of all households were made up of individuals, and 14.8% had someone living alone who was 65 years of age or older. The average household size was 2.21 and the average family size was 2.98.

In the city, the population was spread out, with 22.2% under the age of 18, 18.8% from 18 to 24, 22.2% from 25 to 44, 23.4% from 45 to 64, and 13.4% who were 65 years of age or older. The median age was 34 years. For every 100 females, there were 95.9 males. For every 100 females age 18 and over, there were 111.4 males.

The median income for a household in the city was $28,393, and the median income for a family was $34,688. Males had a median income of $25,938 versus $16,563 for females. The per capita income for the city was $17,828. About 1.9% of families and 6.1% of the population were below the poverty line, including 5.0% of those under the age of eighteen and 5.1% of those 65 or over.

Education
The community is served by Doniphan West USD 111 public school district.

Attractions
 The Four State Lookout is located on high ground north of White Cloud.  A viewing area enables visitors to see the states of Kansas, Missouri, Nebraska and Iowa.
 The Casino White Cloud is located 5 miles west of the town, on the Iowa Tribe Reservation.

References

Further reading

External links

 City of White Cloud
 White Cloud - Directory of Public Officials
 White Cloud city map, KDOT

Iowa Tribe of Kansas and Nebraska
Cities in Kansas
Cities in Doniphan County, Kansas
St. Joseph, Missouri metropolitan area
Kansas populated places on the Missouri River
1855 establishments in Kansas Territory